That Won't Keep a Sailor Down is a 1958 German-Danish comedy-drama film directed by Arthur Maria Rabenalt and starring Karlheinz Böhm, Antje Geerk and Georg Thomalla. It was entered into the 1st Moscow International Film Festival.

Plot
After returning to Copenhagen, a sailor discovers that his wife has died a few days before shortly after giving birth. He now tries to bring up the child, with the help of a young woman he has met.

Cast
Karlheinz Böhm as Peter Hille
Antje Geerk as Christine Hansen
Georg Thomalla as Valdemar V. Olsen
Annie Rosar as Frau Nielsen
Hans Nielsen as Pastor Paulsen
Irene Mann as Paula
Willy Maertens as Herr Nielsen
Gerd Frickhöffer as Hermann
Eddi Arent as Kalle, a Sailor
Johannes Meyer as Waiter

References

External links

1958 films
1958 drama films
1958 comedy-drama films
1958 comedy films
German comedy-drama films
Danish comedy-drama films
West German films
Seafaring films
Films set in Copenhagen
Films directed by Arthur Maria Rabenalt
UFA GmbH films
1950s German-language films
1950s German films